William Gordon (1818 – 9 June 1894) was a British solicitor and Conservative Party politician.

The youngest son of Alexander Gordon, a solicitor of Old Broad Street and Wandsworth Common and his wife Harriet née Elwyn, he was admitted as a solicitor in 1840.

At the 1874 general election Gordon was elected as one of two members of parliament for Chelsea. He served a single term and did not contest the next election in 1880.

References

External links
 

1818 births
1894 deaths
Conservative Party (UK) MPs for English constituencies
UK MPs 1874–1880